Marcia Thornton Jones (born July 15, 1958) is an American writer of children's books, the author or co-author of more than 135 elementary chapter books, picture books, and mid-grade novels, including The Adventures of the Bailey School Kids series, among other works co-written with Debbie Dadey.

Biography 

Jones was born in Joliet, Illinois. She has been an elementary school teacher of first and third grades, computer lab, writing and reading, and Gifted & Talented.  She has been a full-time writer since 1990.  Her books are published by Scholastic, Tor, Dutton (Penguin Group), Hyperion Press (Disney), and F&W. She lives in Lexington, Kentucky with her husband Stephen.

Works

Nonfiction
 Story Sparkers: A creativity guide for children's writers, by Debbie Dadey and Jones (Writer's Digest, 2000)

Fiction  
Jones as sole writer
 Godzilla Ate My Homework (Scholastic Little Apple, 1997) – chapter book for young readers 
 Champ (Scholastic, 2007) – children's novel 
 The Tale of Jack Frost, illus. Priscilla Burris (Scholastic, 2008) – picture book 
 Leprechaun on the Loose, illus. Cyd Moore (Scholastic, 2008) – picture book 
 Ratfink, illus. C. B. Decker (Dutton Children's Books, 2010) – children's novel 

Jones with co-writers 
Keyholders SERIES (Tor Books Starscape, Fall 2009), wri. Dadey and Jones, illus. Adam Stower

The Adventures of the Bailey School Kids (Scholastic, 1992–present), written by Debbie Dadey and Jones, illustrated by John Steven Gurney – SERIES, 65 titles 
The Bailey School Kids Junior SERIES (Scholastic), Dadey and Jones, chapter books
Bailey City Monsters SERIES (Scholastic), Dadey and Jones, illus. Gurney
Ghostville Elementary SERIES (Scholastic, 2003–2007), Dadey and Jones, illus. Jeremy Tugeau (vols 1–4) and Guy Francis (illustrator) (vols 5-8)
 Triplet Trouble and the Runaway Reindeer, by Dadey and Jones, illus. John Speirs (Scholastic Corporation, 1995) – first of a Triple Trouble series (1995–?) 
 Barkley's School for Dogs SERIES (Hyperion Books for Children, 2001)  
 Ghost Dog, Dadey and Jones, illus. Amy Wummer (Hyperion Books for Children, 2001) 
 Ghosts Do Splash in Puddles, Dadey and Jones, illus. Joëlle Dreidemy (2003)

References 

Other sources
 Jones biography at Scholastic Teachers – with transcript of 1997 interview by Scholastic students

External links

 
 
 

1958 births
American children's writers
American horror writers
Writers from Joliet, Illinois
Living people